Tyne and Wear County Council was the county council of the metropolitan county of Tyne and Wear in northeast England. It came into its powers on 1 April 1974 and was abolished on 1 April 1986. The county council was based at Sandyford House in Newcastle upon Tyne. It was replaced with five unitary authorities: Metropolitan Borough of Gateshead, Newcastle City Council, North Tyneside Council, South Tyneside Council and Sunderland City Council.

Political control
The first election to the council was held in 1973, initially operating as a shadow authority before coming into its powers on 1 April 1974. Political control of the council from 1973 until its abolition in 1986 was always held by the Labour Party:

Leadership
Throughout the council's existence the leader of the council was Michael Campbell.

Council elections
 1973 Tyne and Wear County Council election
 1977 Tyne and Wear County Council election
 1981 Tyne and Wear County Council election

References

Former county councils of England
History of Tyne and Wear
1974 establishments in England
1986 disestablishments in England
County Council